A minimum spanning tree (MST) or minimum weight spanning tree is a subset of the edges of a connected, edge-weighted undirected graph that connects all the vertices together, without any cycles and with the minimum possible total edge weight. That is, it is a spanning tree whose sum of edge weights is as small as possible. More generally, any edge-weighted undirected graph (not necessarily connected) has a minimum spanning forest, which is a union of the minimum spanning trees for its connected components.

There are many use cases for minimum spanning trees. One example is a telecommunications company trying to lay cable in a new neighborhood. If it is constrained to bury the cable only along certain paths (e.g. roads), then there would be a graph containing the points (e.g. houses) connected by those paths. Some of the paths might be more expensive, because they are longer, or require the cable to be buried deeper; these paths would be represented by edges with larger weights. Currency is an acceptable unit for edge weight – there is no requirement for edge lengths to obey normal rules of geometry such as the triangle inequality. A spanning tree for that graph would be a subset of those paths that has no cycles but still connects every house; there might be several spanning trees possible. A minimum spanning tree would be one with the lowest total cost, representing the least expensive path for laying the cable.

Properties

Possible multiplicity
If there are  vertices in the graph, then each spanning tree has  edges.

There may be several minimum spanning trees of the same weight; in particular, if all the edge weights of a given graph are the same, then every spanning tree of that graph is minimum.

Uniqueness
If each edge has a distinct weight then there will be only one, unique minimum spanning tree. This is true in many realistic situations, such as the telecommunications company example above, where it's unlikely any two paths have exactly the same cost. This generalizes to spanning forests as well.

Proof:
 Since  and  differ despite containing the same nodes, there is at least one edge that belongs to one but not the other. Among such edges, let  be the one with least weight; this choice is unique because the edge weights are all distinct.
 This contradicts the assumption that  is an MST.

More generally, if the edge weights are not all distinct then only the (multi-)set of weights in minimum spanning trees is certain to be unique; it is the same for all minimum spanning trees.

Minimum-cost subgraph
If the weights are positive, then a minimum spanning tree is in fact a minimum-cost subgraph connecting all vertices, since subgraphs containing cycles necessarily have more total weight.

Cycle property

Proof: Assume the contrary, i.e. that  belongs to an MST .

Cut property

Proof: Assume that there is an MST  that does not contain . This contradicts the assumption that  was a MST.

By a similar argument, if more than one edge is of minimum weight across a cut, then each such edge is contained in some minimum spanning tree.

Minimum-cost edge
If the minimum cost edge  of a graph is unique, then this edge is included in any MST.

Proof: if  was not included in the MST, removing any of the (larger cost) edges in the cycle formed after adding  to the MST, would yield a spanning tree of smaller weight.

Contraction
If  is a tree of MST edges, then we can contract  into a single vertex while maintaining the invariant that the MST of the contracted graph plus  gives the MST for the graph before contraction.

Algorithms

Classic algorithms 
The first algorithm for finding a minimum spanning tree was developed by Czech scientist Otakar Borůvka in 1926 (see Borůvka's algorithm). Its purpose was an efficient electrical coverage of Moravia. The algorithm proceeds in a sequence of stages. In each stage, called Boruvka step, it identifies a forest  consisting of the minimum-weight edge incident to each vertex in the graph , then forms the graph  as the input to the next step. Each Boruvka step takes linear time. Since the number of vertices is reduced by at least half in each step, Boruvka's algorithm takes  time.

A second algorithm is Prim's algorithm, which was invented by Vojtěch Jarník in 1930 and rediscovered by Prim in 1957 and Dijkstra in 1959. Basically, it grows the MST one edge at a time. Initially,  contains an arbitrary vertex.

A third algorithm commonly in use is Kruskal's algorithm, which also takes  time.

A fourth algorithm, not as commonly used, is the reverse-delete algorithm, which is the reverse of Kruskal's algorithm.

All four of these are greedy algorithms. Since they run in polynomial time, the problem of finding such trees is in FP, and related decision problems such as determining whether a particular edge is in the MST or determining if the minimum total weight exceeds a certain value are in P.

Faster algorithms 
Several researchers have tried to find more computationally-efficient algorithms.

In a comparison model, in which the only allowed operations on edge weights are pairwise comparisons,  found a linear time randomized algorithm based on a combination of Borůvka's algorithm and the reverse-delete algorithm.

The fastest non-randomized comparison-based algorithm with known complexity, by Bernard Chazelle, is based on the soft heap, an approximate priority queue. The function  grows extremely slowly, so that for all practical purposes it may be considered a constant no greater than 4; thus Chazelle's algorithm takes very close to linear time.

Linear-time algorithms in special cases

Dense graphs 

If the graph is dense (i.e. , then a deterministic algorithm by Fredman and Tarjan finds the MST in time . The algorithm executes a number of phases. Each phase executes Prim's algorithm many times, each for a limited number of steps. Hence, at most  phases are needed, which gives a linear run-time for dense graphs.

There are other algorithms that work in linear time on dense graphs.

Integer weights 

If the edge weights are integers represented in binary, then deterministic algorithms are known that solve the problem in  integer operations.
Whether the problem can be solved deterministically for a general graph in linear time by a comparison-based algorithm remains an open question.

Decision trees 
Given graph  where the nodes and edges are fixed but the weights are unknown, it is possible to construct a binary decision tree (DT) for calculating the MST for any permutation of weights. Each internal node of the DT contains a comparison between two edges, e.g. The two children of the node correspond to the two possible answers "yes" or "no". In each leaf of the DT, there is a list of edges from  that correspond to an MST. The runtime complexity of a DT is the largest number of queries required to find the MST, which is just the depth of the DT.

For every integer , it is possible to find optimal decision trees for all graphs on  vertices by brute-force search. This search proceeds in two steps.

A. Generating all potential DTs
 There are  different graphs on   vertices.
 For each graph, an MST can always be found using  comparisons, e.g. by Prim's algorithm.
 Every internal node compares two edges. The number of edges is at most  so the different number of comparisons is at most .
 Hence, the number of potential DTs is less than

B. Identifying the correct DTs
To check if a DT is correct, it should be checked on all possible permutations of the edge weights.
 The number of such permutations is at most .
 For each permutation, solve the MST problem on the given graph using any existing algorithm, and compare the result to the answer given by the DT.
 The running time of any MST algorithm is at most , so the total time required to check all permutations is at most .

Hence, the total time required for finding an optimal DT for all graphs with  vertices is:

which is less than

Optimal algorithm 

Seth Pettie and Vijaya Ramachandran have found a  optimal deterministic comparison-based minimum spanning tree algorithm. The following is a simplified description of the algorithm.

 Let , where  is the number of vertices. Find all optimal decision trees on  vertices. This can be done in time  (see Decision trees above).
 Partition the graph to components with at most  vertices in each component. This partition uses a soft heap, which "corrupts" a small number of the edges of the graph.
 Use the optimal decision trees to find an MST for the uncorrupted subgraph within each component.
 Contract each connected component spanned by the MSTs to a single vertex, and apply any algorithm which works on dense graphs in time  to the contraction of the uncorrupted subgraph
 Add back the corrupted edges to the resulting forest to form a subgraph guaranteed to contain the minimum spanning tree, and smaller by a constant factor than the starting graph. Apply the optimal algorithm recursively to this graph.

The runtime of this step is unknown, but it has been proved that it is optimal - no algorithm can do better than the optimal decision tree. Thus, this algorithm has the peculiar property that it is  optimal although its runtime complexity is unknown.

Parallel and distributed algorithms 

Research has also considered parallel algorithms for the minimum spanning tree problem.
With a linear number of processors it is possible to solve the problem in  time.
 demonstrate an algorithm that can compute MSTs 5 times faster on 8 processors than an optimized sequential algorithm.

Other specialized algorithms have been designed for computing minimum spanning trees of a graph so large that most of it must be stored on disk at all times. These external storage algorithms, for example as described in "Engineering an External Memory Minimum Spanning Tree Algorithm" by Roman, Dementiev et al., can operate, by authors' claims,  as little as 2 to 5 times slower than a traditional in-memory algorithm. They rely on efficient external storage sorting algorithms and on graph contraction techniques for reducing the graph's size efficiently.

The problem can also be approached in a distributed manner.  If each node is considered a computer and no node knows anything except its own connected links, one can still calculate the distributed minimum spanning tree.

MST on complete graphs
Alan M. Frieze showed that given a complete graph on n vertices, with edge weights that are independent identically distributed random variables with distribution function  satisfying , then as n approaches +∞ the expected weight of the MST approaches , where  is the Riemann zeta function (more specifically is  Apéry's constant). Frieze and Steele also proved convergence in probability. Svante Janson proved a central limit theorem for weight of the MST.

Applications
Minimum spanning trees have direct applications in the design of networks, including computer networks, telecommunications networks, transportation networks, water supply networks, and electrical grids (which they were first invented for, as mentioned above). They are invoked as subroutines in algorithms for other problems, including the Christofides algorithm for approximating the traveling salesman problem, approximating the multi-terminal minimum cut problem (which is equivalent in the single-terminal case to the maximum flow problem),
and approximating the minimum-cost weighted perfect matching.

Other practical applications based on minimal spanning trees include:
 Taxonomy.
 Cluster analysis: clustering points in the plane, single-linkage clustering (a method of hierarchical clustering), graph-theoretic clustering, and clustering gene expression data.
 Constructing trees for broadcasting in computer networks.
 Image registration and segmentation – see minimum spanning tree-based segmentation.
 Curvilinear feature extraction in computer vision.
 Handwriting recognition of mathematical expressions.
 Circuit design: implementing efficient multiple constant multiplications, as used in finite impulse response filters.
 Regionalisation of socio-geographic areas, the grouping of areas into homogeneous, contiguous regions.
 Comparing ecotoxicology data.
 Topological observability in power systems.
 Measuring homogeneity of two-dimensional materials.
 Minimax process control.
 Minimum spanning trees can also be used to describe financial markets. A correlation matrix can be created by calculating a coefficient of correlation between any two stocks. This matrix can be represented topologically as a complex network and a minimum spanning tree can be constructed to visualize relationships.

Related problems

The problem of finding the Steiner tree of a subset of the vertices, that is, minimum tree that spans the given subset, is known to be NP-Complete.

A related problem is the k-minimum spanning tree (k-MST), which is the tree that spans some subset of k vertices in the graph with minimum weight.

A set of k-smallest spanning trees is a subset of k spanning trees (out of all possible spanning trees) such that no spanning tree outside the subset has smaller weight.  (Note that this problem is unrelated to the k-minimum spanning tree.)

The Euclidean minimum spanning tree is a spanning tree of a graph with edge weights corresponding to the Euclidean distance between vertices which are points in the plane (or space).

The rectilinear minimum spanning tree is a spanning tree of a graph with edge weights corresponding to the rectilinear distance between vertices which are points in the plane (or space).

In the distributed model, where each node is considered a computer and no node knows anything except its own connected links, one can consider distributed minimum spanning tree. The mathematical definition of the problem is the same but there are different approaches for a solution.

The capacitated minimum spanning tree is a tree that has a marked node (origin, or root) and each of the subtrees attached to the node contains no more than a c nodes. c is called a tree capacity. Solving CMST optimally is NP-hard, but good heuristics such as Esau-Williams and Sharma produce solutions close to optimal in polynomial time.

The degree constrained minimum spanning tree is a minimum spanning tree in which each vertex is connected to no more than d other vertices, for some given number d. The case d = 2 is a special case of the traveling salesman problem, so the degree constrained minimum spanning tree is NP-hard in general.

For directed graphs, the minimum spanning tree problem is called the Arborescence problem and can be solved in  time using the Chu–Liu/Edmonds algorithm.

A maximum spanning tree is a spanning tree with weight greater than or equal to the weight of every other spanning tree.
Such a tree can be found with algorithms such as Prim's or Kruskal's after multiplying the edge weights by -1 and solving
the MST problem on the new graph. A path in the maximum spanning tree is the widest path in the graph between its two endpoints: among all possible paths, it maximizes the weight of the minimum-weight edge.
Maximum spanning trees find applications in parsing algorithms for natural languages
and in training algorithms for conditional random fields.

The dynamic MST problem concerns the update of a previously computed MST after an edge weight change in the original graph or the insertion/deletion of a vertex.

The minimum labeling spanning tree problem is to find a spanning tree with least types of labels if each edge in a graph is associated with a label from a finite label set instead of a weight.

A bottleneck edge is the highest weighted edge in a spanning tree. A spanning tree is a minimum bottleneck spanning tree (or MBST) if the graph does not contain a spanning tree with a smaller bottleneck edge weight. A MST is necessarily a MBST ( by the cut property), but a MBST is not necessarily a MST.

References

Further reading
 Otakar Boruvka on Minimum Spanning Tree Problem (translation of both 1926 papers, comments, history) (2000) Jaroslav Nešetřil, Eva Milková, Helena Nesetrilová. (Section 7 gives his algorithm, which looks like a cross between Prim's and Kruskal's.)
 Thomas H. Cormen, Charles E. Leiserson, Ronald L. Rivest, and Clifford Stein. Introduction to Algorithms, Second Edition. MIT Press and McGraw-Hill, 2001. . Chapter 23: Minimum Spanning Trees, pp. 561–579.
 Eisner, Jason (1997). State-of-the-art algorithms for minimum spanning trees: A tutorial discussion. Manuscript, University of Pennsylvania, April. 78 pp.
 Kromkowski, John David. "Still Unmelted after All These Years", in Annual Editions, Race and Ethnic Relations, 17/e (2009 McGraw Hill) (Using minimum spanning tree as method of demographic analysis of ethnic diversity across the United States).

External links

 Implemented in BGL, the Boost Graph Library
 The Stony Brook Algorithm Repository - Minimum Spanning Tree codes
 Implemented in QuickGraph for .Net

Spanning tree
Polynomial-time problems